The 1930–31 season was the 31st season of competitive football in Belgium. R Antwerp FC won their second Premier Division title.
From the next season on, Division I was expanded from one division to two (both of 14 clubs), and Promotion was extended from three divisions to four (also of 14 clubs each). Therefore, many clubs from Promotion promoted to Division I.

Overview
At the end of the season, RFC Montegnée and SC Anderlechtois were relegated to the Division I, while RRC de Gand (Division I winner) and FC Turnhout were promoted to the Premier Division.
The Promotion – the third level in Belgian football – was won by AS Ostende, Hoboken SK and RC Tirlemont, who were promoted to Division I as well as the 2nd, 3rd and 4th placed clubs from the 3 leagues and the 2 best 5th-placed teams.  No clubs were relegated from Division I to Promotion.

National team

* Belgium score given first

Key
 H = Home match
 A = Away match
 N = On neutral ground
 F = Friendly
 o.g. = own goal

Honours

Final league tables

Premier Division

Division I

External links
RSSSF archive – Final tables 1895–2002
Belgian clubs history